Luperosoma is a genus of leaf beetles in the family Chrysomelidae. There are about seven described species in Luperosoma. They are found in North America and the Neotropics.

Species
These seven species belong to the genus Luperosoma:
 Luperosoma amplicorne (Baly, 1886)
 Luperosoma nigrum Blake
 Luperosoma parallelum (Horn, 1893)
 Luperosoma parvulum (Jacoby, 1888)
 Luperosoma schwarzi (Horn, 1896)
 Luperosoma subsulcatum (Horn, 1893)
 Luperosoma vittatum Blake

References

Further reading

 
 

Galerucinae
Chrysomelidae genera
Articles created by Qbugbot
Taxa named by Martin Jacoby